The Sibola Range is a subrange of the Tahtsa Ranges, located north of Tahtsa Lake in northern British Columbia, Canada.

References

Sibola Range in the Canadian Mountain Encyclopedia

Hazelton Mountains